Maskanah Subdistrict  is a subdistrict of Manbij District in Aleppo Governorate of northern Syria. The administrative centre is the town of Maskanah.

At the 2004 census, the subdistrict had a population of 64,829.

References 

Manbij District
Maskanah